Gelson Rodrigues de Souza known as Gelson (born 3 January 1982, in Juscimeira, Mato Grosso) is a Brazilian football striker who played for Aris Limassol F.C. in the Cypriot First Division.

He arrived Europe and young age and played for Italian Serie D side Larcianese in summer 2002, and Pistoiese Primavera team before landed on Italian speaking canton of Switzerland.

He made 4 appearances in UEFA Champions League 2005-06.

External links
 CBF

1982 births
Living people
Brazilian footballers
Brazilian expatriate footballers
U.S. Pistoiese 1921 players
Serie B players
AC Bellinzona players
FC Thun players
FC Chiasso players
FC Schaffhausen players
FC Locarno players
Swiss Super League players
APEP FC players
Ethnikos Achna FC players
Aris Limassol FC players
Cypriot First Division players
Expatriate footballers in Italy
Expatriate footballers in Switzerland
Expatriate footballers in Cyprus
Association football forwards
Sportspeople from Mato Grosso
Place of birth missing (living people)